Norbert Wojciech Ozimek (born 24 January 1945 in Warsaw) is a Polish former weightlifter who competed in the 1968 Summer Olympics and in the 1972 Summer Olympics.

References

1945 births
Living people
Polish male weightlifters
Olympic weightlifters of Poland
Weightlifters at the 1968 Summer Olympics
Weightlifters at the 1972 Summer Olympics
Olympic silver medalists for Poland
Olympic bronze medalists for Poland
Olympic medalists in weightlifting
Sportspeople from Warsaw
Medalists at the 1972 Summer Olympics
Medalists at the 1968 Summer Olympics
20th-century Polish people
21st-century Polish people